Behind Brigitte Bardot (subtitled Cool Sounds from Her Hot Scenes) is an album by composer, arranger and conductor Pete Rugolo featuring performances of tunes associated with the films of Brigitte Bardot, and other French films, recorded in late 1959 and first released on the Warner Bros. label.

Reception

The Allmusic review by Jason Ankeny noted: "the precise raison d'être behind the album is a mystery, but it's nevertheless a charmer, boasting some of Pete Rugolo's lushest and loveliest arrangements ... wry, cool-toned jazz melodies heavy on innuendo and late-night appeal. Whatever the notion behind the session, the execution's delightful".

Track listing
 "Jeff's Blues" (Jeff Davis) – 2:52
 "Mambo Bardot" (Paul Misraki) – 4:03
 "Tell Me Something Sweet" (Misraki, André Hornez, Judy Spencer) – 2:39
 "Arsenic-Blues" (Marc Lanjean) – 3:16
 "Paris B.B." (André Hodeir) – 2:17
 "Manina Theme" (Jean Yatove) – 3:34
 "A T'Aimer" (René Cloërec, Henri Contet) – 2:12
 "L' Etang" (Misraki) – 2:52
 "Ma Vie Est a Toi" (Bill Byers) – 3:03
 "The Night Heaven Fell" (Burt Bacharach, Hal David) – 2:39 
Recorded in Los Angeles, CA on December 18, 1959 (tracks 1, 2, 4, 5 & 9) and December 30, 1959 (tracks 3, 6–8 & 10).

Related films
 from L'Homme et l'Enfant (1956)
 from And God Created Woman (1956)
 from And God Created Woman (1956)
 from La Peau de l'ours (1957)
 from Une Parisienne (1957)
 from The Girl in the Bikini (1952)
 from Love Is My Profession (1958)
 from Sans Famille (1958)
 from Le Grand Bluff (1957)
 from The Night Heaven Fell (1958)

Personnel
Pete Rugolo – arranger, conductor
Pete Candoli, Ollie Mitchell, Jack Sheldon – trumpet 
Milt Bernhart, Frank Rosolino – trombone 
Ken Shroyer – bass trombone
Vincent DeRosa, Richard Perissi – French horn
Buddy Collette, Chuck Gentry, Paul Horn, Ted Nash, Bud Shank – reeds
Larry Bunker (tracks 1, 2, 4, 5 & 9), Gene Estes (tracks 3, 6–8 & 10) – vibraphone, percussion
Fred Katz – piano, cello
Laurindo Almeida – guitar
Phil Stephens – bass, tuba
Buddy Clark (tracks 1, 2, 4, 5 & 9), Joe Mondragon (tracks 3, 6–8 & 10) – bass
Mel Lewis – drums
Gloria Wood – vocals

References

Pete Rugolo albums
1960 albums
Warner Records albums
Albums arranged by Pete Rugolo
Albums conducted by Pete Rugolo
Brigitte Bardot